Cimini is an Italian surname. Notable people with the surname include:
Angiola Cimini, Marchesana della Petrella (1700–1727), Italian noble
Anthony Cimini (1922–1987), American politician
Giacomo Cimini (born 1977), Italian film director
Paolo Cimini (born 1964), Italian cyclist

Italian-language surnames